Roberto Carlos González Castellero (born 21 May 1994) is a Panamanian cyclist, who currently rides for UCI Continental team .

Major results
Source: 

2013
 6th Time trial, National Road Championships
2014
 National Road Championships
2nd Time trial
3rd Road race
2015
 2nd Time trial, National Road Championships
2017
 National Road Championships
9th Road race
10th Time trial
2018
 National Road Championships
2nd Road race
6th Time trial
2019
 9th Overall Tour of Albania
2020
 Vuelta a Guatemala
1st Stages 2 & 3
 4th Road race, Central American Road Championships
 National Road Championships
4th Road race
5th Time trial
2022
 4th Road race, Central American Road Championships
 National Road Championships
4th Time trial
8th Road race

References

External links
 

1994 births
Living people
Panamanian male cyclists
Competitors at the 2018 Central American and Caribbean Games
20th-century Panamanian people
21st-century Panamanian people